There are several characters named Acmon or Akmon (Ancient Greek: Ἄκμων means 'anvil, pestle') in Greek mythology:
 Acmon, one of the mythical race of Dactyls.
Acmon, a Phrygian king who gave his name to the district known as Acmonia.
 Acmon, a mischievous forest creature who lived in Thermopylae or on Euboea but roamed the world and might turn up anywhere mischief was afoot.
 Acmon, a companion of Diomedes in Italy. He was turned into a bird.
 Acmon, the Aenead, son of Clytius (son of Aeolus), a friend of Aeneas in Roman mythology. Together with his father, they followed Aeneas in his exile after the fall of Troy.

Notes

References 

 Graves, Robert, The Greek Myths, Harmondsworth, London, England, Penguin Books, 1960. 
Graves, Robert, The Greek Myths: The Complete and Definitive Edition. Penguin Books Limited. 2017. 
Publius Ovidius Naso, Metamorphoses translated by Brookes More (1859-1942). Boston, Cornhill Publishing Co. 1922. Online version at the Perseus Digital Library.
 Publius Ovidius Naso, Metamorphoses. Hugo Magnus. Gotha (Germany). Friedr. Andr. Perthes. 1892. Latin text available at the Perseus Digital Library.
 Publius Vergilius Maro, Aeneid. Theodore C. Williams. trans. Boston. Houghton Mifflin Co. 1910. Online version at the Perseus Digital Library.
 Publius Vergilius Maro, Bucolics, Aeneid, and Georgics. J. B. Greenough. Boston. Ginn & Co. 1900. Latin text available at the Perseus Digital Library.
 Strabo, The Geography of Strabo. Edition by H.L. Jones. Cambridge, Mass.: Harvard University Press; London: William Heinemann, Ltd. 1924. Online version at the Perseus Digital Library.
 Strabo, Geographica edited by A. Meineke. Leipzig: Teubner. 1877. Greek text available at the Perseus Digital Library.
Suida, Suda Encyclopedia translated by Ross Scaife, David Whitehead, William Hutton, Catharine Roth, Jennifer Benedict, Gregory Hays, Malcolm Heath Sean M. Redmond, Nicholas Fincher, Patrick Rourke, Elizabeth Vandiver, Raphael Finkel, Frederick Williams, Carl Widstrand, Robert Dyer, Joseph L. Rife, Oliver Phillips and many others. Online version at the Topos Text Project.

Metamorphoses characters
Characters in the Aeneid
Characters in Greek mythology
Metamorphoses into birds in Greek mythology